Ishtybayevo (İştebay) is a rural locality (a village) in Bolsheshadinsky Selsoviet, Mishkinsky District, Bashkortostan, Russia. The population was 295 as of 2010. There are 5 streets.

Geography 
Ishtybayevo is located 15 km north of Mishkino (the district's administrative centre) by road. Karasimovo is the nearest rural locality.

References 

Rural localities in Mishkinsky District